Enlighten Harm Reduction is an organisation based in Melbourne, Victoria, Australia, dedicated to informing drug users about which chemicals are in their drugs by using various tests. Before attracting heavy amounts of legal and political attention, Enlighten was present at many of the major dance events in Australia, providing facilities for drug users to test their pills (ecstasy in particular) for their contained chemicals.

Johnboy Davidson, an Enlighten founding member, often speaks on behalf of the organisation in interviews and other public appearances. Some notable appearances include the Insight (SBS Television Australia) forum on "Dealing With Drugs" and several appearances on Triple J's current affairs program Hack

Current services
Due to the increased legal pressure that Enlighten has experienced, the organisation now operates mainly through the Internet. Drug users are able to buy reagent testing kits from Enlighten' web site which can be used to check the contents of a pill.

The kits currently available are:
Marquis Reagent - indicates a possible presence of either MDxx, amphetamines, 2C-B, 2C-I, DXM or opiates
Mandelin Reagent - increases the accuracy of the Marquis Reagent and also indicates a possible presence of ketamine and PMA.
Simon's Reagent - screens for secondary amines such as MDMA, MDEA and methamphetamine

Enlighten also manages the website Pillreports which is one of the largest databases of pill testing results on the Internet with over 5,000 entries.

Amphetamines and other synthetic drugs inquiry
On December 4, 2005, the Australian Parliament together with the Australian Crime Commission initiated an inquiry into amphetamines and other synthetic drugs (AOSD). Enlighten Harm Reduction was one of thirty three organisations to make a submission to the inquiry.

Enlighten's submission consisted of the following sections:
Harm Reduction - An indispensable tool
Limitations of Legal Strategies
Toxicological Aspects of Various Party Drugs
Reducing Demand for Illicit Drugs

References

External links
Pillreports online database
Inquiry into Amphetamines and Other Synthetic Drugs (AOSD) home page

Drug culture
Harm reduction